Deer Hill Avenue is a reality series that pokes fun at the suburban way-of-life: a combination of comedy, audacity, and confrontations delivered by guests from all walks-of-life. The series revolves around two experienced personalities; Kirk Rundhaug, a well known real estate guru, featured on the HGTV series "Selling New York" and Lou Milano, the group mischief maker and well known radio show personality on WRKI, i95, ”The Home of Rock’n’Roll.” Also featured are Kirk's daughters, actresses Grace Rundhaug and Sophie Rundhaug, both of whom sing, act, and dance. Grace was featured in “The Sound of Music” live on NBC in 2014 with Carrie Underwood, and Sophie has been in commercials and stage productions. The show also includes Mike Bonesera (The Contractor), and Blood, Sweat and Tears founding member, Steve Katz. The show is produced by John Balis and Kevin Burns, and directed by Brean Cunningham.

Deer Hill Avenue takes place in a New England suburb, Danbury, CT. The show's crew of house flippers includes real people, amusing, flawed, and likeable; each with his/her own agenda. Season one is six episodes. The series premiered to a full house at the Ridgefield Playhouse, Ridgefield, CT in November 2014 and is scheduled to launch on Comcast Cable in January, 2014.

References

2010s American reality television series
2014 American television series debuts
2016 American television series endings